Franz Marischka (1918–2009) was an Austrian actor, screenwriter and film director. He was the son of the director Hubert Marischka.

Selected filmography

Screenwriter
 The Daughter of the Regiment (1953)
 Victoria and Her Hussar (1954)
 Die Christel von der Post (1956)
 Love, Summer and Music (1956)
 Almenrausch and Edelweiss (1957)
 Mikosch, the Pride of the Company (1958)
 A Summer You Will Never Forget (1959)
 Mandolins and Moonlight (1959)
 Agatha, Stop That Murdering! (1960)
 Legacy of the Incas (1965)

Actor
 Voices of Spring (1952)
 Adventure in Vienna (1952)
 Rose of the Mountain (1952)
 Knall and Fall as Imposters  (1952)
 Three Lederhosen in St. Tropez (1980)

Director
 Mikosch of the Secret Service (1959)
 Three Lederhosen in St. Tropez (1980)
 Sunshine Reggae in Ibiza (1983)

References

Bibliography
 Goble, Alan. The Complete Index to Literary Sources in Film. Walter de Gruyter, 1999.

External links

1918 births
2009 deaths
Austrian film directors
Austrian male screenwriters
Austrian male film actors
20th-century Austrian screenwriters
20th-century Austrian male writers